Eagle Lake is a lake in Hubbard County, in the U.S. state of Minnesota.

Eagle Lake was named for the eagles which nested there.

See also
List of lakes in Minnesota

References

Lakes of Minnesota
Lakes of Hubbard County, Minnesota